Debate has occurred throughout Oceania over proposals to legalize same-sex marriage as well as civil unions.

Currently two countries and eight territories in Oceania recognize some type of same-sex unions. Two Oceanian countries, Australia and New Zealand, and eight territories or states, namely Easter Island, French Polynesia, Guam, Hawaii, New Caledonia, the Northern Mariana Islands, the Pitcairn Islands and Wallis and Futuna allow same-sex couples to legally marry. In American Samoa, same-sex marriage is not performed, but same-sex marriages from other jurisdictions are recognized.

Current situation

National level

Sub-national level

Public opinion

Notes

See also 

 LGBT rights in Oceania
 Australian Marriage Law Postal Survey
 Recognition of same-sex unions in Africa
 Recognition of same-sex unions in the Americas
 Recognition of same-sex unions in Asia
 Recognition of same-sex unions in Europe

Notes

References